Up for the Derby is a 1933 British sports comedy film directed by Maclean Rogers and starring Sydney Howard, Dorothy Bartlam and Tom Helmore. The screenplay concerns a tramp who unexpectedly gains money.

It was made at British and Dominion Elstree Studios. The film's sets were designed by the art director Frederick Pusey.

Plot
A tramp unexpectedly comes into some money, and buys a racehorse which goes on to win The Derby.

Cast
 Sydney Howard as Joe Burton
 Dorothy Bartlam as Dorothy Gordon
 Mark Daly as Jerry Higgs
 Tom Helmore as Ronnie Gordon
 Frederick Lloyd as Major Edwards
 Franklyn Bellamy as Palmer
 Jane Carr as Singer
 Frank Harvey as George Moberley
 Lew Stone and his band as Themselves

References

Bibliography
 Low, Rachael. Filmmaking in 1930s Britain. George Allen & Unwin, 1985.
 Wood, Linda. British Films, 1927-1939. British Film Institute, 1986.

External links

1933 films
British horse racing films
Films directed by Maclean Rogers
Films set in England
British black-and-white films
British and Dominions Studios films
Films shot at Imperial Studios, Elstree
1930s sports comedy films
British sports comedy films
1933 comedy films
1930s British films